Charles Avery Reeder (November 20, 1843 – September 28, 1902) was an American soldier who fought for the Union Army during the American Civil War. He received the Medal of Honor for valor.

Biography
Reeder received the Medal of Honor in April 3, 1867 for his actions at Fort Gregg during the Third Battle of Petersburg on April 2, 1865 while with Company G of the 12th West Virginia Volunteer Infantry Regiment.

Medal of Honor citation

Citation:

The President of the United States of America, in the name of Congress, takes pleasure in presenting the Medal of Honor to Private Charles A. Reeder, United States Army, for extraordinary heroism on 2 April 1865, while serving with Company G, 12th West Virginia Infantry, in action at Petersburg (Battery Gregg), Virginia, for capture of flag.

See also

List of American Civil War Medal of Honor recipients: Q–S

References

External links

1843 births
1902 deaths
Union Army soldiers
United States Army Medal of Honor recipients
American Civil War recipients of the Medal of Honor
Military personnel from West Virginia